A by-election was held in the Barbadian constituency of St George North on November 11, 2020 following the resignation of incumbent BLP Member of Parliament Gline Clarke, who has represented the constituency for the past 26 years, to accept the post of Barbados High Commissioner to Canada. It was the first election to take place since Prime Minister Mia Mottley's governing Barbados Labour Party won all seats in the House of Assembly in the 2018 Barbadian general election.

Previous election

Campaign

Contesting parties

Result
Toni Moore won the election, keeping the seat in BLP hands. Shortly after the election, Grenville Phillips II, the leader of the Solutions Barbados party, announced that he was retiring from further political activity.

Turnout was over 14% lower in the district than in 2018, with less than half of eligible voters participating.

See also
2018 Barbadian general election
List of parliamentary constituencies of Barbados

References

Barbados
2020 in Barbados
Elections in Barbados
November 2020 events in North America
By-elections in Barbados